is a Japanese sports manga series written and illustrated by Noboru Rokuda and first published in 1980 in Weekly Shōnen Sunday.  The manga had 158 chapters.

The manga was also adapted into a 65-episode anime television series by Tatsunoko Production in 1981, chiefly directed by Masayuki Hayashi.  The anime was aired across Japan on Fuji TV Sundays at 6 p.m. from 4 October 1981 to 26 December 1982.

Story
The hero of the story is a teenage boy named Kappei Sakamoto, who is a high school student with amazing athletic abilities who joins the basketball team of Seirin High School and quickly becomes one of the most skilled players.  Kappei has one unusual handicap for a basketball player - his height; he stands not even one meter tall.  His Achilles' heel is female undergarments; he has a particular interest in white panties, and is even more enthusiastic about joining the basketball team when he discovers that the team's female coach, Coach Natsu, wears white panties (although his inventive attempts to sneak a peek at said panties usually result in a physical beatdown from the hot-tempered coach).  Eventually, Kappei's athletic prowess extends beyond basketball, and he tries out for - and excels at - every sport the school offers.

In the first episode, Kappei meets and becomes enamored with Akane Aki, a sweet, pretty girl who is quite athletic herself (she later joins the school's ping-pong team) and signs on as assistant coach of Seirin's basketball team.  Much to Kappei's delight, not only is Akane pretty, but she also wears white panties, and Kappei sets his sights on winning her heart.  Kappei eventually moves in with Akane and her family after his parents (who are rarely around) leave for the United States.  However, Kappei has an unusual rival for Akane's heart - Akane's dog, Seiichiro, who has often fantasized about marrying his owner and, resenting Kappei, immediately seeks to sabotage his relationship with Akane through various tricks.  Seiichiro can also speak, although only Kappei can understand him.

Characters

The protagonist of the story who not only excels in basketball, he also excels in every sport and loves to be in the spotlight, especially when he is admired by the girls. He is obsessed with white women's panties, for him a "symbol of purity." He falls in love with Akane, and wants to marry her.

Akane is transfer student to Seirin High, becomes the assistant coach of the school's basketball team. She befriends Kappei and is a strong believer in his talents, and though she initially finds him rather strange, soon develops feelings for him, and even shows signs of jealousy when Kappei shows interest in other girls.

Akane's dog, who can walk and speak like a human being, although only Kappei can understand his speech. He is also enamored of Akane and dreams of marrying her (despite the fact that she is human and he a dog) and, resenting Kappei's muscling his way into her life, becomes Kappei's sworn enemy, but also his best friend. He often appears in brief entr'actes to explain the rules of whatever sport Kappei happens to be playing at that time.

The basketball team's hot-tempered coach. Though she tries to be a proper young lady and is on the hunt for a boyfriend, she loses patience easily (especially with Kappei) and is well known for her grotesque and humorous facial expressions when angered.

Captain of the basketball team.

A member of the basketball team.
Daiba

A member of a rival basketball team. He stands nearly two meters tall, and is a giant in every sense of the term. He is also Akane's ex-boyfriend; Akane broke up with him because of his violent temper, and now he wants to discredit Kappei and win her back.
Mr. Okazaki

Kappei and Akane's homeroom teacher.

References

External links
 
 

1979 manga
1981 anime television series debuts
Basketball in anime and manga
Fuji TV original programming
Shogakukan manga
Shōnen manga
Tatsunoko Production